Dear Dumb Diary is a series of children's novels by Jim Benton. Each book is written in the first person view of a middle school girl named Jamie Kelly. The series is published by Scholastic in English and Random House in Korean. Film rights to the series have been optioned by the Gotham Group.

The series follows the adventures of Jamie Kelly at Mackerel Middle School.

Reception
Critical reception for the series has been mixed, with Publishers Weekly writing that the lead character "makes the occasional funny observation, more often her stabs at humor miss their mark or are so protracted that the comic moment fizzles". A reviewer for the Indian Express compared My Pants are Haunted! to the Diary of a Wimpy Kid series, saying that fans of Wimpy Kid would like the series.

Books

Year One 
 1. Let's Pretend This Never Happened (July 1, 2004)
 2. My Pants Are Haunted! (October 1, 2004)
 3. Am I the Princess or the Frog? (June 1, 2005)
 4. Never Do Anything, Ever (November 1, 2005)
 5. Can Adults Become Human? (May 1, 2006)
 6. The Problem With Here Is That It's Where I'm From (July 1, 2007)
 7. Never Underestimate Your Dumbness (March 1, 2008)
 8. It's Not My Fault I Know Everything (January 1, 2009)
 9. That's What Friends Aren't For (January 1, 2010)
 10. The Worst Things In Life Are Also Free (June 1, 2010)
 11. Okay, So Maybe I Do Have Superpowers (January 1, 2011)
 12. Me! (Just Like You, Only Better) (June 1, 2011)

Year Two 
 1. School. Hasn't This Gone Long Enough? (January 1, 2012)
 2. The Super-Nice Are Super-Annoying (June 1, 2012)
 3. Nobody's Perfect. I'm As Close As It Gets (January 1, 2013)
 4. What I Don't Know Might Hurt Me (June 25, 2013)
 5. You Can Bet on That (May 27, 2014)
 6. Live Each Day to the Dumbest (May 26, 2015)

Deluxe 
 1. Dumbness is a Dish Best Served Cold (June 28, 2016)

Movie

A film version had been filmed in Salt Lake City, Utah, starring Emily Alyn Lind as Jamie and Mary-Charles Jones as Jamie’s best friend Isabella.

The movie premiered on Nickelodeon on September 6, 2013, and is now available on streaming services like Netflix.

See also

 Adrian Mole
 Diary
 List of fictional diaries

References

External links
 Official Dear Dumb Diary site from Scholastic.

American children's novels
Series of children's books
Fictional diaries